José Luis Ballester Rubert (born August 17, 1969) is a former butterfly swimmer from Spain, who competed at three consecutive Summer Olympics for his native country, starting in 1988. At each Olympic appearance he was eliminated in the qualifying heats.

Ballester was born in Vinaròs, Castellón, Spain.

Ballester received an athletic scholarship to attend the University of Florida in Gainesville, Florida, where he swam for the Florida Gators swimming and diving team in National Collegiate Athletic Association (NCAA) competition.  He graduated from the University of Florida with a bachelor's degree in management in 2003.

See also 
 List of University of Florida alumni
 List of University of Florida Olympians

References

External links 
 Spanish Olympic Committee
 

1969 births
Living people
Florida Gators men's swimmers
Male butterfly swimmers
Olympic swimmers of Spain
Sportspeople from Castellón de la Plana
Swimmers at the 1988 Summer Olympics
Swimmers at the 1992 Summer Olympics
Swimmers at the 1996 Summer Olympics
Mediterranean Games silver medalists for Spain
Mediterranean Games medalists in swimming
Swimmers at the 1987 Mediterranean Games